The Ginter Building is a historic U.S. building located at 1540 Highland Avenue, Eau Gallie, Florida.  The building was constructed in 1926 by Clifford Ginter.  Over the years, it was used as an apartment building, a rescue mission house, a store, professional offices, and a nursery school.

Notes

Gallery

Buildings and structures in Melbourne, Florida
Eau Gallie, Florida
Commercial buildings in Florida
1926 establishments in Florida
Buildings and structures completed in 1926